César was a  74-gun ship of the line of the French Navy.

Career 
Ordered on 24 April 1804, César was one of the ships built in the various shipyards captured by the First French Empire in Holland and Italy in a crash programme to replenish the ranks of the French Navy.

She was commissioned on 23 June 1807  but remained inactive from October to April 1808.

In March 1809, ten deserters stole a launch and escaped the ship, only to be captured by the 4-gun Actif. In 1814, she took part in the defence of Antwerp, and was sailed to Brest after the Bourbon Restoration. She was ceded to the Netherlands on 1 August 1814 and renamed Prins Frederik serving until 1821 when she was broken up.

Notes, citations, and references

Notes

Citations

References
 

Ships of the line of the French Navy
Téméraire-class ships of the line
1807 ships